The 1901 Colorado Agricultural Aggies football team represented Colorado Agricultural College (now known as Colorado State University) in the Colorado Football Association (CFA) during the 1901 college football season.  In their first season under head coach C. J. Griffith, the Aggies compiled a 1–2 record and outscored opponents by a total of 56 to 32.

The Aggies opened their season under head coach George Toomey and played a game on October 12 against Colorado. When the Aggies placed an ineligible player into the game, Colorado's coach Fred Folsom protested and refused to proceed. However, Colorado failed to follow procedures, and the Intercollegiate Athletic Association of Colorado awarded the game to the Aggies as a forfeit. Toomey resigned following the game and was replaced as head coach by C.J. Griffith. Despite being awarded the forfeit, Colorado State does not count the game as a win in its media guide.

Schedule

References

Colorado Agricultural
Colorado State Rams football seasons
Colorado Agricultural Aggies football